Edwin William Carr Jr.   (2 September 1928 – 25 March 2018) was an Australian athlete. He was a gold medallist in the 440 yards and 4 x 440 yard relay at the 1950 British Empire Games and also competed in the 1952 Summer Olympics in Helsinki.

In addition to his athletic career, Carr was also a surgeon. After the Helsinki Olympics, he completed his studies in medicine and surgery at the University of Sydney. He was visiting honorary surgeon at Blacktown Hospital from 1965 to 1984, and was a military surgeon at Ingleburn Army Camp in Sydney. In 1970, he did a tour of duty in the Vietnam War as a surgeon at the Australian field hospital in Vũng Tàu.

In 2000, a portrait of him was hung in the Archibald Prize painted by Ann Morton. That year, he was one of the former Australian Olympians who participated in the Torch Relay before the Sydney 2000 Olympic Games. His father, Slip Carr, was also an Olympian (1924 Paris 100m semi-finalist).

References

External links
 

1928 births
2018 deaths
Australian male sprinters
Commonwealth Games gold medallists for Australia
Olympic athletes of Australia
Athletes (track and field) at the 1950 British Empire Games
Athletes (track and field) at the 1952 Summer Olympics
Commonwealth Games medallists in athletics
Australian surgeons
Australian military doctors
Medallists at the 1950 British Empire Games